The Reichsannalen are a class of annals composed anonymously in the Carolingian Empire throughout the 9th century. They first appeared under Pepin the Short in 741 and became ubiquitous at monasteries throughout the empire in the following decades. They were not official court annals, but they often bear the bias of having been written in one regnum or another. 

The Reichsannalen are distinguished from earlier and later classes of annals by their coverage of supranational and not just local events; they covered the entire empire. Though usually composed at monasteries, they are contrasted with monastic annals which emphasise ecclesiastical and especially local happenings over those of the larger Reich. Some historians, such as Ranke (Zur Kritik fränkisch-deutscher Reichsannalisten. Berlin, 1854) have seen a sheen of officiality in the various annals for the kings whose reigns they cover. The authors of the Reichsannalen show a greater awareness of external affairs, military manœuvres, and court politics than the cloistered penmen of the monastic annals. 

The earliest of the annals is the Royal Frankish Annals, dating from 741. For information before that date, the Chronicon Universale (MGH: Scriptores, XIII, 1–19) was drawn up about 761. The Chronicon contains information derived from Bede, Fredegar, Isidore of Seville, the Liber Pontificalis, the Annales Mosellani, and the Annales Laureshamenses. During the reign of Charlemagne, Reichsannalen proliferate: the Annales Laurissenses minores (c.806), the Annales Maximiani (810–811) and the Annals of Flavigny (816) crop up.

The Annales Fuldenses, the most famous of them all, appear in the reign of Louis the Pious. They have a regional, East Frankish character, but purport to record national events. The author must certainly have been in touch with the court. They cover the period from in 711 until 901 with information drawn from the Annales Laurissenses minores, the Royal Frankish Annals, and the official Annales Lithienses. The counterpart of the Fuldenses is the Annales Bertiniani in West Francia, of a more universal character and probably more objective. They form the source for the Chronicon de gestis Normannorum in Francia. In Lotharingia, the Annales Vedastini appear and form the basis for the Chronicon Vedastinum, a universal chronicle continuing until 899.

In the 10th century, the Reichsannalen died out: Flodoard of Reims is the only real example, writing from 919 to 966.

See also 
 Royal Frankish Annals

Sources